Walter John Zealley (2 November 1874 – 15 May 1956) was an English footballer who played as an inside-left. He represented Great Britain at the 1900 Olympic Games in Paris, winning a gold medal as a member of Upton Park club team. He scored one goal.

Zealley was a dairy farmer, working on the family farm in Dorset, and a Sergeant in the Dorset Yeomanry. His brother, Arthur, played Minor Counties cricket for Dorset.

He played as an amateur with Bridport, where he scored 73 goals in 226 appearances between 1899 and 1908. He regularly joined Upton Park for annual tours of Britain, the Channel Islands and France.

References

External links

1874 births
1956 deaths
Footballers from Dorset
English footballers
Association football inside forwards
English Olympic medallists
Olympic gold medallists for Great Britain
Olympic footballers of Great Britain
Footballers at the 1900 Summer Olympics
Olympic medalists in football
Medalists at the 1900 Summer Olympics
Bridport F.C. players
Upton Park F.C. players
Queen's Own Dorset Yeomanry officers